The 2019 SANFL Women's League season was the third season of the SANFL Women's League (SANFLW). The season commenced on 15 February and concluded with the Grand Final on 26 May 2019.

Clubs

Ladder

Finals series

First semi-final

Second semi-final

Preliminary final

Grand Final

References 

SANFL Women's League
SANFLW